Ralf Bulang (born 2 February 1991) is a German former professional footballer who played as a midfielder.

Career
Bulang made his professional debut for Werder Bremen II in the 3. Liga on 3 April 2010, coming on as a substitute in the 88th minute for Felix Schiller in the 1–1 home draw against 1. FC Heidenheim.

References

External links
 
 

1991 births
Living people
People from Altdöbern
Footballers from Brandenburg
German footballers
Association football midfielders
SV Werder Bremen II players
FC Oberneuland players
3. Liga players
Regionalliga players